Ivar Schjøtt (born 28 December 1955) is a Norwegian fencer. He competed in the team épée event at the 1984 Summer Olympics.

References

External links
 

1955 births
Living people
Norwegian male épée fencers
Olympic fencers of Norway
Fencers at the 1984 Summer Olympics
Sportspeople from Bergen
20th-century Norwegian people